Irodotos Football Club, short for Podosferikós Athlitikós Sýllogos Alikarnassoú Iródotos (meaning Irodotos Football Sports Club of Halicarnassus) and also simply known as Irodotos, is a Greek football club, based in Nea Alikarnassos, Heraklion. The club is named after the ancient historian Herodotus, descended from Halicarnassus, Asia Minor, whose bust is also used as the club logo. Irodotos was established in 1932 by refugees from Asia Minor (and specifically the site of modern Bodrum, then still called Halicarnassus), who were displaced following the Greco-Turkish War in 1922. By acclamation, Irodotos is considered the third most successful club in Heraklion in terms of achievements, due to its consistent presence in the Second and Third national divisions, but has maintained a considerable fan base, and a longstanding rivalry with local Superleague side OFI, despite the fact the two haven't met in national competitions for almost 30 years. The club currently competes in the Football League, the second tier of the Greek football league system, while also administering amateur men's football and basketball departments. In the past it also had departments for wrestling, cycling, women's football and athletics. Its colours are blue and white.

History

Early years and legacy
Several years after the public housing development of Nea Alikarnassos was founded (in 1925), former Halicarnassus residents and refugees established a sports club in order to strengthen the collective consciousness ties between the inhabitants of the settlement. The club was named after Herodotus, thus commemorating the ancient historian native to Halicarnassus. The club was officially established as Podosferikos Athlitikos Syllogos Alikarnassou Irodotos (or P.A.S.A. Irodotos) by then community president, Michalis Eleftheriadis and other prominent figures of the refugee community. In its early years, and until the end of the German occupation of Crete, Irodotos' sporting activities were primarily mild, before reverting to full activity in 1948.

Irodotos joined the Third Division of the regional Heraklion Football Clubs Association, managing consecutive promotions to reach the First Division and compete against historical clubs such as OFI and Ergotelis. Irodotos promoted to national competitions (e.g. the Beta Ethniki, second tier of the Greek football league system) in 1960, and played in the competition until 1965, when the club was relegated to the newly established Gamma Ethniki (third level in the league pyramid). In total, Irodotos has played 12 seasons in the Second National Division (relegated for the last time in 1982) and 16 times in the Gamma Ethniki, thus making it the club with the third most appearances in professional competitions based in Heraklion, behind ex-Greek Superleague local rivals OFI and Ergotelis. Furthermore, Irodotos has reached the Greek Football Cup Quarter-finals once in 1987–88 (losing to competition finalists Panathinaikos) and the Round of 16 twice, the first time during the 1981−82 season (eliminated by eventual competition winners AEK) and for a second time during 1988−89, when they were eliminated by club rival OFI.

Recent years
In recent years, Irodotos have played primarily in the Gamma Ethniki, from which they were last relegated in the end of the 2014–15 season after being deducted fifteen points by the Hellenic Football Federation in response to the murder of visiting fan Kostas Katsoulis by Irodotos hooligans in the municipal Nea Alikarnassos Stadium during a Football League 2 home match vs. Ethnikos Piraeus.

After the tragic incidents that took place in 2015, Irodotos made a triumphant return to the Gamma Ethniki winning four trophies  in a single season during 2016−17. More specifically, Irodotos was crowned champion of the Heraklion FCA Championship, while also managing to win the Heraklion FCA Cup, along with the Greek Football Amateur Cup and eventually the Greek Amateurs' Super Cup. Their next season in the Gamma Ethniki saw them win the Group 8 title and qualify to the Football League promotion play-offs, where they eventually celebrated their return to the 2nd tier of the Greek football league system after a 36-year absence.

Players

Current squad

Honours

Domestic

Leagues
Third Division
Winners (1): 1975–76 Fourth DivisionWinners (3): 1991–92, 2003–04, 2020–21

Cups
 Greek Football Amateur Cup Winners (1): 2016–17
 Amateurs' Super Cup Greece Winners (1): 2016–17

Regional

LeaguesHeraklion FCA ChampionshipWinners (7): 1964−65, 1968−69, 1971−72, 1975−76, 2000−01, 2001−02, 2016−17

CupsHeraklion FCA CupWinners (8):''' 1975−76, 1994−95, 2001−02, 2005−06, 2007−08, 2012−13, 2015−16, 2016−17

References

External links
 Official website 

 
Football clubs in Heraklion
Football clubs in Crete
Association football clubs established in 1932
1932 establishments in Greece
Super League Greece 2 clubs